The Olympic Green Archery Field was one of nine temporary venues for the 2008 Summer Olympics. It hosted the archery events.

The field occupied 9.22 hectares and had a seating capacity of 5,000. After the games it was dismantled.

References

Venues of the 2008 Summer Olympics
Olympic archery venues
Defunct sports venues in China
Buildings and structures in Chaoyang District, Beijing